Fred Channell (5 May 1910 – 1975) was a professional footballer who played for Harwich & Parkeston, Haywards Heath, Peterborough & Fletton United, Northfleet United and Tottenham Hotspur.

Football career 
The full back started his playing career as an outside-left forward at Harwich & Parkeston before joining Haywards Heath Town. In 1930 Channell had his first spell at Tottenham. After a trial in 1931 at Clapton Orient he moved to Peterborough & Fletton United. He went on to play for the Spurs nursery club Northfleet United, Channell rejoined the Lilywhites in 1933 to go on to play 109 matches and scoring a single goal in all competitions for the White Hart Lane club.

References

External links

Fred Channell stats

1910 births
1975 deaths
People from Edmonton, London
English footballers
Harwich & Parkeston F.C. players
Haywards Heath Town F.C. players
Tottenham Hotspur F.C. players
Peterborough & Fletton United F.C. players
Northfleet United F.C. players
English Football League players
Association football fullbacks